Moholm is a locality situated in Töreboda Municipality, Västra Götaland County, Sweden with 640 inhabitants in 2010.

References 

Populated places in Västra Götaland County
Populated places in Töreboda Municipality